Robo Defense is a 2009 real-time strategy tower defense video game developed by Lupis Labs. The game was released on 16 September 2009 for Android. The game involves player player placing down turret towers to prevent enemies who come from one end of the map to reach the other end.

Gameplay 
Robo Defense is a real-time strategy tower defense game with five different maps. The game could be started by pressing the new game. The player would then be sent to the "select difficulty" screen, where players can choose their desired map and level of difficulty by clicking the top and down arrowhead. The game has only ten different difficulties in the beginning, but new level of difficulties would appear after the player finished the maximum level of difficulty.

After selecting the desired level of difficulty and map, the player start with an empty field/track. After a few moments, the enemies, in the form of little infantry troops, would start appear. The player must place down towers in order to obstruct the path of enemy. To do this, the player must buy one of turret tower displayed in the bottom right corner of the screen by clicking on it. After clicking a tower, the player could drag it into the field of play. The player could upgrade the tower by clicking the turret tower and choosing one of the upgrades available. The player may obstruct the enemy's path by making the route longer through the strategic placement of turret tower, but the player is not allowed to block the enemy's path. Killing an enemy generates in-game cash for the player, which in turn could be used to buy and/or upgrade turret towers. The player would lose a health bar for every enemy that managed to pass to the other end of the map. If the health bar goes down to zero, the player loses the game.

There are several different of enemies and turret towers. The land attacker enemies would follow the route made by the placement of turret towers, while air attacker enemies would went straight ahead for the other end, ignoring the presence of turret tower. Meanwhile, the turret tower has three different types. The machine gun and rocket towers, also known respectively as the blue and yellow towers, could shoot down both land and air attacker. The slow tower, on the other hand, could only slow down enemies. These towers have multiple variants which could be obtained through upgrades.

Development 
The game was released for Android on 16 September 2009 by Lupis Labs. The game has two different versions, the paid version and the free version. The paid version of the game has five different maps and unlimited difficulties, while the free version comes with only one map and 11 difficulties and doesn't allow the player to save in-game progress.

Reception

Sales and accolades 
The game was named as the best-selling premium Android game in October 2009 and was downloaded 7,600 times over the course of the month. From January to March 2011, the game regained the title of the best-selling premium Android game and was downloaded 186 thousand times in the Android Market.

Critical response 
The game received mostly positive reviews, with some comparing the game to Fieldrunners. Jon Mundy, writing for Pocket Gamer, stated the game as being heavily inspired by "medieval siege warfare". He also described the game as a clone of Fieldrunners that almost has the same graphics when compared to Fieldrunners. However, the reviewer praised the game for giving opportunity for players to upgrade and modify the turret tower, since it makes the game significantly differ from the more straightforward gameplay of Fieldrunners.

Andrew Podolsky from GameSpot lauded the game as "precise, well executed, and works very well". Despite criticizing the game as less impressive and the inability to zoom in and out in the opening and ending of the review, Podolsky later praised the game's distinctiveness for allowing the player to increase the level of the turret tower between level changes and the game's ability to customize difficulty and maps. Ryan Paul of Ars Technica commended the game's simplistic user interface and the well appearance of the units and terrain. Despite this, he described the game as "not visually stunning".

References 

Android (operating system) games
Android (operating system)-only games
2009 video games
Tower defense video games
Real-time strategy video games
Video games about robots
Video games developed in the United States